The 1925 LFF Lyga was the 4th season of the LFF Lyga football competition in Lithuania.  It was contested by 13 teams, and Kovas Kaunas won the championship.

Kaunas Group

Klaipėda Group

Šiauliai Group

Final
Kovas Kaunas 2-0 LFLS Šiauliai

References
RSSSF

LFF Lyga seasons
Lith
Lith
1925 in Lithuanian football